Karegaon is a village in Parner taluka in Ahmednagar district of state of Maharashtra, India.

Economy
The majority of the population has farming and government sector as their primary occupation.
Some youngsters are in Defence Services of India to serve the Nation.

Major Attractions
Gramdaivat Shri Kareshwar Devasthan and Gajabai Muktabai Mandir are major attraction of Karegaon.
 Villages in Parner taluka

References

Villages in Parner taluka
Villages in Ahmednagar district